Danny Bryan Bejarano Yañez (born 3 January 1994) is a Bolivian professional footballer who plays as a midfielder for Greek Super League club Lamia.

Club career
He started his career playing for Oriente Petrolero in Liga de Fútbol Profesional Boliviano.

On 23 May 2015, the Santa Cruz central midfielder Danny Bejarano migrate into Greek football side playing for Panetolikos signing a three years' contract. "He has the ability to play for the club. Danny had a good season. The player is very happy for this great step in his football career."  said his manager Rodrigo Osorio.

On 5 January 2016, Panetolikos announced that Bejarano would be returning to Bolivia for six months to play for Club Bolívar. On 14 July 2016, he signed a long season contract with Sport Boys Warnes on loan from Panetolikos and on 24 July 2018 he signed a six months contract as a loanee with Oriente Petrolero.

On 22 December 2018, he signed a contract with Lamia for an undisclosed fee.

International career
As of 1 May 2016, Bejarano has earned 11 caps for Bolivia and he represented his country in 5 FIFA World Cup qualification matches.

References

External links
 
 

1994 births
Living people
Sportspeople from Santa Cruz de la Sierra
Bolivian footballers
Bolivia international footballers
Association football midfielders
Bolivian Primera División players
Super League Greece players
Oriente Petrolero players
Panetolikos F.C. players
Club Bolívar players
Sport Boys Warnes players
PAS Lamia 1964 players
2015 Copa América players
2021 Copa América players
Bolivian expatriate footballers
Expatriate footballers in Greece
Expatriate footballers in Ecuador
Bolivian expatriate sportspeople in Greece